John Alfred Moretz House is a historic home located at Hickory, Catawba County, North Carolina. It was built in 1917, and is a two-story, brick dwelling patterned after a Cotswold (or English) Cottage.  It features rough stone entrance arches.

It was listed on the National Register of Historic Places in 1985.

References

Hickory, North Carolina
Houses on the National Register of Historic Places in North Carolina
Houses completed in 1917
Houses in Catawba County, North Carolina
National Register of Historic Places in Catawba County, North Carolina
1917 establishments in North Carolina